Verzasca may refer to:

Valle Verzasca, valley in Switzerland
Verzasca, river in Switzerland
Verzasca, municipality in Switzerland